The Asia–Pacific and Middle East Region is a region that competes in the Little League World Series. In , Japanese teams began competing in the newly created Far East Region.

In , the Little League World Series was expanded to sixteen teams, and East Asia was split into two regions – the Pacific (consisting of teams from the Pacific Islands, Indonesia, and Oceania) and Asia (consisting of teams from mainland Asia). In , the regions were reconfigured. Japan was given its own automatic berth in the Series, while the remaining Asian teams merged with the Pacific teams to create the Asia-Pacific Region.

In , the region was reorganized as the Asia-Pacific and Middle East Region. Australia, now the fourth-largest country and the largest outside North America in Little League participation, received its own LLWS region. All Middle Eastern countries with Little League programs, except for Israel and Turkey, were placed in the former Asia-Pacific Region. Previously, the Middle East had formed a region with Africa, but that region was disbanded, with African teams joining the Europe and Africa Region (formerly Europe Region, which also includes Israel and Turkey).

Asia–Pacific and Middle East Region Countries

Asia Region (2001–2006)

In 2001, the Far East Region split into the Asia and Pacific regions. The Asia Region comprised Little Leagues from mainland Asia.

Asia Regional Championship

The list below lists each country's participant in the Asia Region Tournament between 2001 and 2006. Each year's winner is indicated in green.

LLWS results

Pacific Region (2001–2006)

In 2001, the Far East Region split into the Asia and Pacific regions.  The list below lists each country's participant in the Pacific Region Tournament between 2001 and 2006. Each year's winner is indicated in green.  No team from the Pacific Region won the Little League World Series.

Pacific Regional Championship

LLWS results

Asia-Pacific Region (2007–2012)

In 2007, the Asia and Pacific regions were reconfigured again. Japan was given its own place in the LLWS and the remaining Asian and Pacific teams were merged into one region.

Asia-Pacific Regional Championship

The list below lists each country's participant in the Asia-Pacific Little League Region Tournament between 2007 and 2012. That year's winner is indicated in green.

LLWS results

Asia-Pacific and Middle East Region (2013–)
As noted above, this region was reconfigured in 2013, with the spin-off of Australia into its own LLWS region and the addition of Middle Eastern countries.

LLWS results by country
The following table lists each Asia-Pacific country's record in the Little League World Series. Italics indicates team is no longer in the region. Table includes results for teams that qualified for either the East Asian, Pacific, Asia, or Asia-Pacific regional LLWS berth through the 2019 Little League World Series.

See also
Asia-Pacific Region in other Little League divisions
Little League
Far East Region (1962–2000)
Japan Region (2007–  )
Intermediate League
Junior League
Senior League
Big League

Philippine Series
2008 Little League Philippine Series
2009 Little League Philippine Series

Notes

References

External links
 Little League Online

Asia-Pacific and Middle East
Baseball leagues in Asia